The 2021 Nigerien coup d'etat attempt occurred on 31 March at around 3 am WAT (2 am UTC) after gunfire erupted in the streets of Niamey, the capital of Niger, two days before the inauguration of president-elect Mohamed Bazoum. 

The coup attempt was staged by elements within the military, and was attributed to an Air Force unit based in the area of the Niamey Airport. The alleged leader of the plot was Captain Sani Saley Gourouza, who was in charge of security at the unit's base. After the coup attempt was foiled, the perpetrators were arrested.

Context
In addition, the coup d'état occurs during a peaceful transition between two democratically elected presidents, a context unprecedented in Niger. The swearing-in of the new president Mohamed Bazoum would occur two days after the attempted coup. However, the defeated opponent and ex-president Mahamane Ousmane contested the election results and lodged a legal appeal with the constitutional court, which was rejected. In 2020, a coup d'état overthrew the government of Malian President Ibrahim Boubacar Keïta.

Events 
According to Cyril Payen of France 24, "heavy weapon fire was heard for half an hour in the area of the presidential palace. But the Presidential Guard repelled this attack and the situation seems to have come under control", and the noise of the fighting woke up locals around 3am (local time). The majority of the perpetrators were arrested by the government but some, including the leader of the coup Sani Saley Gourouza, are still at large.

Reactions 

Nigerian President Muhammadu Buhari described the act as "naive and old-fashioned". The President of the African Union and the Economic Community of West African States condemned the attempted coup, a sentiment which was also echoed by other African countries, including Chad and Algeria.

References

Coup d'etat attempt
Nigerien coup d'état attempt, 2021
History of Niamey
March 2021 events in Africa
Military coups in Niger